Jože Gerkman is a retired slalom canoeist who competed for Yugoslavia from the mid-to-late 1960s. He won a silver medal in the C-2 team event at the 1965 ICF Canoe Slalom World Championships in Spittal.

References

External links 
 Joze GERKMAN at CanoeSlalom.net

Yugoslav male canoeists
Possibly living people
Year of birth missing (living people)
Medalists at the ICF Canoe Slalom World Championships